The 1931 Ladies Open Championships was held at the Queen's Club, West Kensington in London from 19 to 23 January 1931. Cecily Fenwick won her third title defeating Nancy Cave in the final. A record 44 entries were received for the 1931 Open Championship

Draw and results

First round

Main draw

References

Women's British Open Squash Championships
Women's British Open Squash Championships
Women's British Open Squash Championships
Women's British Open Squash Championships
Women's British Open Squash Championships
Squash competitions in London
Women's British Open Squash Championships